Girl 2 Lady is the second album released by Beni Arashiro from label Avex Trax. The song FLASH was a digital released and was a CM theme song for the product KOSE VISEE. The album reached the #87 spot on the Oricon charts.

Track listing

Charts

Oricon Sales Chart (Japan)

Singles

References

2006 albums
Beni (singer) albums